İmamverdili (also, Birinci İmamverdili, Imamverdili Pervoye, and Imash-Verdylyar) is a village and municipality in the Beylagan Rayon of Azerbaijan.  It has a population of 1,200.

References 

Populated places in Beylagan District